Sinapistrum can be one of these two plant genera:

Sinapistrum Chevall., a synonym of the genus Sinapis L. 
Sinapistrum Mill., a synonym of the genus Cleome L.